Pavel Viktorovich Mogilevskiy (born 17 April 1980) is a Russian professional football coach and a former player. He is the manager of FC Forte Taganrog.

Playing career
He made his debut in the Russian Premier League in 2000 for FC Rotor Volgograd.

References

1980 births
Living people
Russian footballers
Russian Premier League players
FC Rotor Volgograd players
FC Tom Tomsk players
FC Rostov players
FC Baltika Kaliningrad players
FC Volga Nizhny Novgorod players
FC Luch Vladivostok players
FC Sodovik Sterlitamak players
FC Fakel Voronezh players
Association football defenders
Russian football managers
FC Urozhay Krasnodar managers
Sportspeople from Volgograd